Sam Strijbosch (born 11 January 1995) is a Dutch former professional footballer. He played as a midfielder, most notably for Helmond Sport.

Club career
Strijbosch played in the youth of NWC Asten and was later included in the Helmond Sport youth academy. In the summer of 2014, the midfielder was promoted to the first team. 

He made his professional debut in the Eerste Divisie for Helmond Sport on 9 February 2015 in a 0–5 loss to Sparta Rotterdam. Due to injuries to Kevin Visser and Daniel Guijo-Velasco, he made his first start in his first professional appearance. Fifteen minutes before time, head coach Jan van Dijk substituted Strijbosch for Arne van Geffen. In August 2017, Strijbosch was loaned for one season to Blauw Geel '38, in order for him to gain more playing time. He returned to Helmond Sport on 22 November 2017. 

Strijbosch's contract with Helmond expired in mid-2018 and he started playing for amateur club RKSV Nuenen. Strijbosch announced his retirement from football in June 2020.

References

External links
 

1995 births
People from Asten, Netherlands
Living people
Dutch footballers
Helmond Sport players
Blauw Geel '38 players
RKSV Nuenen players
Eerste Divisie players
Derde Divisie players
Vierde Divisie players
Association football midfielders
Footballers from North Brabant